Dead Souls («Мёртвые души») is a 1976 Russian-language opera in three acts by Rodion Shchedrin based on the novel Dead Souls by Gogol, to a libretto by the composer. It was premiered at the Kirov in 1977, and overseas in Boston in 1988.

Recordings
 radio recording - Bolshoi Theatre Chorus and Orchestra, Yevgeny Svetlanov  (1976).
 Vinyl and CD  - Bolshoi Theatre Chorus and Orchestra, Yuri Temirkanov, 1982 Melodiya: MELCD1001837 - 2 CDs Reviewed in Gramophone Magazine 7/96.
 television recording - Mariinsky Theatre "Golden Mask" Festival (May, 2012)

References

1976 operas
Russian-language operas
Operas by Rodion Shchedrin
Operas
Operas based on works by Nikolai Gogol
Operas based on novels